This page shows the progress of Cheltenham Town F.C. in the 2007–08 football season. During the season, Cheltenham Town competed in League One in the English league system.

League table

Results

Football League One

FA Cup

League Cup

Football League Trophy

Players

First-team squad
Includes all players who were awarded squad numbers during the season.

Left club during season

References

Cheltenham Town F.C. seasons
Cheltenham Town